Charly Jacobs (21 July 1948 – 9 January 2013) was a Belgian footballer. He played for Sporting Charleroi for 10 years. He also played in one match for the Belgium national football team in 1979.

References

External links
 

1948 births
2013 deaths
Belgian footballers
Belgium international footballers
Place of birth missing
Association football forwards